Margaret of Cleves (c. 1375–14 May 1411) was a German noblewoman. A daughter of Adolph III, Count of Mark and Margaret of Jülich (making her sister to Adolph I), in 1394 she became the second wife of Albert I, Duke of Bavaria, though the marriage remained childless. The couple held court in The Hague.

Ancestors

1375 births
1411 deaths
Countesses of Holland
Countesses of Hainaut
People from the Duchy of Cleves
14th-century German women
House of La Marck